Robert "Bobby" Braithwaite (24 February 1937 – 14 October 2015) was a Northern Irish footballer who played as a left winger.

Born in Belfast and growing up near Seaview, Braithwaite began his career with Crusaders, before joining Linfield in 1957. He later played for Middlesbrough and won ten caps for Northern Ireland. Between 1956 and 1963, he represented the Irish League XI eight times.

References

1937 births
2015 deaths
Middlesbrough F.C. players
Linfield F.C. players
Northern Ireland international footballers
Association football wingers
English Football League players
Association footballers from Belfast
Association footballers from Northern Ireland
Northern Ireland amateur international footballers
Crusaders F.C. players